Moyen-Chari may refer to:

 Moyen-Chari Prefecture, a prefecture of Chad 1960–1999
 Moyen-Chari Region, a region of Chad 2002–present